John William Rudd (born August 7, 1955) is an American former basketball player for the New York Knicks. He played forward. He was listed at 6'7" and 230 pounds. He was born on August 7, 1955 in DeRidder, Louisiana. He attended McNeese State University. His first game was on October 31, 1978.

Rudd is best known for his college career at McNeese State, where he was named to the Southland Conference all-1970s team and in 2016 his number 52 jersey was honored by the school and hangs in the Cowboys’ gym rafters.

References

External links 
Basketball-Reference Statistics

1955 births
Living people
American men's basketball players
Basketball players from Louisiana
McNeese Cowboys basketball players
New York Knicks draft picks
New York Knicks players
People from DeRidder, Louisiana
Small forwards